Belmontejo is a municipality in Cuenca, Castile-La Mancha, Spain. It has a population of 250.

References

External links

  Página de la Diputación de Cuenca sobre este municipio.

Municipalities in the Province of Cuenca